The 1983 Mississippi State Bulldogs football team represented Mississippi State University during the 1983 NCAA Division I-A football season. With a 45–26 win over LSU, Bulldog quarterback John Bond became the first and only quarterback to register four wins over LSU.

Schedule

Personnel

Season summary

Mississippi State

"The Immaculate Deflection" - Artie Crosby missed a 27-yard field goal attempt with 24 seconds left when 40 mile-per-hour winds knocked down the football before it could pass the crossbar.

References

Mississippi State
Mississippi State Bulldogs football seasons
Mississippi State Bulldogs football